Fyllida was one of the four provinces of Serres Prefecture, Greece. Its territory corresponded with that of the current municipalities Amfipoli and Nea Zichni. It was abolished in 2006.

References

Provinces of Greece